Henttala is a Finnish surname. Notable people with the surname include:

Joonas Henttala (born 1991), Finnish racing cyclist
Lotta Henttala (born 1989), Finnish racing cyclist

Finnish-language surnames